Novograd-Volynsky Uyezd (Новоград-Волынский уезд) was one of the subdivisions of the Volhynian Governorate of the Russian Empire. It was situated in the southeastern part of the governorate. Its administrative centre was Novohrad-Volynskyi.

Demographics
At the time of the Russian Empire Census of 1897, Novograd-Volynsky Uyezd had a population of 348,950. Of these, 65.5% spoke Ukrainian, 15.6% Yiddish, 10.9% German, 5.2% Polish, 2.4% Russian, 0.1% Czech and 0.1% Bashkir as their native language.

References

 
Uezds of Volhynian Governorate
Volhynian Governorate